Nuno João Oliveira Gonçalves (born 9 July 1998) is a Portuguese professional footballer who plays for Greek Super League 2 club Episkopi as a defender.

Club career
On 21 December 2017, Gonçalves made his professional debut with Vitória Guimarães B in a 2017–18 LigaPro match against Sporting B.

References

External links

1998 births
Living people
Portuguese footballers
Association football defenders
Liga Portugal 2 players
Vitória S.C. B players